Zlatko Vitez (born 22 June 1950 in Varaždin) is a Croatian theatre and film actor. He also served as the Croatian Minister of Culture in the period between October 1994 and November 1995 in the Cabinet of Nikica Valentić.

Vitez graduated from the Zagreb Academy of Dramatic Art in 1972 and went on to appear in about a hundred theatre productions at several prominent theatres, including the Gavella Drama Theatre and the Croatian National Theatre in Zagreb.

Between the mid-1970s and late 1990s he also appeared in a number of Croatian television and feature films, most notably the leading role in Zvonimir Berković's 1985 film Love Letters with Intent (Ljubavna pisma s predumišljajem).

References

External links
 
 Zlatko Vitez biography 

1950 births
Living people
People from Varaždin
Croatian male actors
Academy of Dramatic Art, University of Zagreb alumni
Vladimir Nazor Award winners
Culture ministers of Croatia
Croatian Democratic Union politicians
Croatian actor-politicians